Linden Grove was a former stop on the Overbrook line, named for a nearby restaurant and tavern originally established by Pittsburgh Railways Company's predecessor, the Pittsburgh and Castle Shannon Railroad to increase their passenger revenues.   The stop was closed when the Overbrook line shut down in 1993, and was consolidated with the nearby Memorial Hall stop when the line was rebuilt in 2004.

Former Port Authority of Allegheny County stations
Railway stations closed in 1993

References